This is a list of the mammal species recorded in Kazakhstan. Kazakhstan has 124 mammal species, of which one is critically endangered, five are endangered, 12 are vulnerable, and four are near threatened. One of the species listed for Kazakhstan can no longer be found in the wild.

The following tags are used to highlight each species' conservation status as assessed by the International Union for Conservation of Nature:

Order: Artiodactyla (even-toed ungulates)

The even-toed ungulates are ungulates whose weight is borne about equally by the third and fourth toes, rather than mostly or entirely by the third as in perissodactyls. There are about 220 artiodactyl species, including many that are of great economic importance to humans.
Family: Cervidae (deer)
Subfamily: Cervinae
Genus: Cervus
Wapiti, C. canadensis 
Central Asian red deer C. hanglu 
Bactrian deer, C. h. bactrianus
Subfamily: Capreolinae
Genus: Alces
Moose, A. alces  
Genus: Capreolus
 Siberian roe deer, C. pygargus 
Family: Moschidae (musk deer)
Genus: Moschus
 Siberian musk deer, M. moschiferus 
Family: Bovidae (cattle, antelope, sheep, goats)
Subfamily: Antilopinae
Genus: Gazella
Goitered gazelle, G. subgutturosa 
Genus: Saiga
 Saiga antelope, S. tatarica 
Subfamily: Caprinae
Genus: Capra
 Siberian ibex, C. sibrica 
Genus: Ovis
Argali, O. ammon 
Urial, O. vignei 
Family: Suidae (pigs)
Subfamily: Suinae
Genus: Sus
Wild boar, S. scrofa

Order: Carnivora (carnivorans)

There are over 260 species of carnivorans, the majority of which feed primarily on meat. They have a characteristic skull shape and dentition.
Family: Felidae (cats)
Subfamily: Felinae
Genus: Caracal
Caracal, C. caracal 
Genus: Felis
Jungle cat, F. chaus 
African wildcat, F. lybica 
Asiatic wildcat, F. l. ornata
Sand cat, F. margarita 
Genus: Lynx
 Eurasian lynx, L. lynx 
Genus: Otocolobus
Pallas's cat, O. manul 
Subfamily: Pantherinae
Genus: Panthera
Leopard, P. pardus  vagrant
P. p. tulliana  vagrant
Snow leopard, P. uncia 
Family: Canidae (dogs, foxes)
Genus: Canis
Golden jackal, C. aureus 
Gray wolf, C. lupus 
Genus: Vulpes
Corsac fox, V. corsac 
Red fox, V. vulpes 
Family: Ursidae (bears)
Genus: Ursus
Brown bear, U. arctos 
Family: Mustelidae (mustelids)
Genus: Lutra
European otter, L. lutra 
Genus: Martes
Beech marten, M. foina 
European pine marten, M. martes 
Sable, M. zibellina 
Genus: Meles
Asian badger, M. leucurus 
Genus: Mellivora
Honey badger, M. capensis 
Genus: Mustela
Mountain weasel, M. altaica 
Stoat, M. erminea 
Steppe polecat, M. eversmannii 
Least weasel, M. nivalis 
Genus: Vormela
Marbled polecat, V. peregusna 
Family: Phocidae (earless seals)
Genus: Pusa
Caspian seal, P. caspica

Order: Chiroptera (bats)

The bats' most distinguishing feature is that their forelimbs are developed as wings, making them the only mammals capable of flight. Bat species account for about 20% of all mammals.
Family: Vespertilionidae
Subfamily: Myotinae
Genus: Myotis
Lesser mouse-eared bat, M. blythii 
Brandt's bat, M. brandti 
Pond bat, M. dasycneme 
Geoffroy's bat, M. emarginatus 
Subfamily: Vespertilioninae
Genus: Eptesicus
 Bobrinski's serotine, Eptesicus bobrinskoi LC
 Botta's serotine, Eptesicus bottae LC
Genus: Hypsugo
 Savi's pipistrelle, H. savii 
Genus: Nyctalus
Greater noctule bat, N. lasiopterus 
Lesser noctule, N. leisleri 
Common noctule, N. noctula 
Genus: Pipistrellus
 Kuhl's pipistrelle, Pipistrellus kuhlii LC
 Common pipistrelle, Pipistrellus pipistrellus LC
Genus: Plecotus
 Grey long-eared bat, Plecotus austriacus LC
Family: Rhinolophidae
Subfamily: Rhinolophinae
Genus: Rhinolophus
Greater horseshoe bat, R. ferrumequinum 
Lesser horseshoe bat, R. hipposideros

Order: Erinaceomorpha (hedgehogs and gymnures)

The order Erinaceomorpha contains a single family, Erinaceidae, which comprise the hedgehogs and gymnures. The hedgehogs are easily recognised by their spines while gymnures look more like large rats.

Family: Erinaceidae (hedgehogs)
Subfamily: Erinaceinae
Genus: Paraechinus
 Brandt's hedgehog, P. hypomelas

Order: Lagomorpha (lagomorphs)
The lagomorphs comprise two families, Leporidae (hares and rabbits) and Ochotonidae (pikas). Though they can resemble rodents, and were classified as a superfamily in that order until the early 20th century, they have since been considered a separate order. They differ from rodents in a number of physical characteristics, such as having four incisors in the upper jaw rather than two.
Family: Leporidae (hares and rabbits)
Genus: Lepus
European hare, L. europaeus 
Mountain hare, L. timidus 
Tolai hare, L. tolai 
Family: Ochotonidae (pikas)
Genus: Ochotona
 Alpine pika, O. alpina 
 Large-eared pika, O. macrotis 
 Steppe pika, O. pusilla 
 Turkestan red pika, O. rutila

Order: Perissodactyla (odd-toed ungulates)

The odd-toed ungulates are browsing and grazing mammals. They are usually large to very large, and have relatively simple stomachs and a large middle toe.
Family: Equidae (horses etc.)
Genus: Equus
 Wild horse E. ferus   reintroduced
 Tarpan, E. f. ferus 
 Przewalski's horse, E. f. przewalskii  reintroduced
 Onager, E. hemionus 
 Mongolian wild ass, E. h. hemionus
 Turkmenian kulan, E. h. kulan

Order: Rodentia (rodents)

Rodents make up the largest order of mammals, with over 40% of mammalian species. They have two incisors in the upper and lower jaw which grow continually and must be kept short by gnawing.
Family: Hystricidae (Old World porcupines)
Genus: Hystrix
Indian crested porcupine, H. indica 
Family: Castoridae (beavers)
Genus: Castor
Eurasian beaver, C. fiber 
Family: Sciuridae (squirrels)
Subfamily: Xerinae
Tribe: Xerini
Genus: Spermophilopsis
 Long-clawed ground squirrel, Spermophilopsis leptodactylus LC
Tribe: Marmotini
Genus: Eutamias
 Siberian chipmunk, Eutamias sibiricus LC
Genus: Marmota
 Gray marmot, Marmota baibacina Lc
 Bobak marmot, Marmota bobak LC
 Menzbier's marmot, Marmota menzbieri VU
Genus: Spermophilus
 Red-cheeked ground squirrel, Spermophilus erythrogenys LC
 Yellow ground squirrel, Spermophilus fulvus LC
 Russet ground squirrel, Spermophilus major LC
 Little ground squirrel, Spermophilus pygmaeus LC
 Tien Shan ground squirrel, Spermophilus relictus LC
 Long-tailed ground squirrel, Spermophilus undulatus LC
Family: Gliridae (dormice)
Subfamily: Leithiinae
Genus: Dryomys
 Forest dormouse, Dryomys nitedula LC
Genus: Selevinia
 Desert dormouse, Selevinia betpakdalaensis EN
Family: Dipodidae (jerboas)
Subfamily: Allactaginae
Genus: Allactaga
 Small five-toed jerboa, Allactaga elater LC
 Great jerboa, Allactaga major LC
 Severtzov's jerboa, Allactaga severtzovi LC
 Mongolian five-toed jerboa, Allactaga sibirica LC
 Vinogradov's jerboa, Allactaga vinogradovi LC
Genus: Pygeretmus
 Lesser fat-tailed jerboa, Pygeretmus platyurus LC
 Dwarf fat-tailed jerboa, Pygeretmus pumilio LC
 Greater fat-tailed jerboa, Pygeretmus shitkovi LC
Subfamily: Cardiocraniinae
Genus: Cardiocranius
 Five-toed pygmy jerboa, Cardiocranius paradoxus VU
Genus: Salpingotus
 Thick-tailed pygmy jerboa, Salpingotus crassicauda VU
 Heptner's pygmy jerboa, Salpingotus heptneri LC
 Pallid pygmy jerboa, Salpingotus pallidus LC
Subfamily: Dipodinae
Genus: Dipus
 Northern three-toed jerboa, Dipus sagitta LC
Genus: Eremodipus
 Lichtenstein's jerboa, Eremodipus lichtensteini LC
Genus: Paradipus
 Comb-toed jerboa, Paradipus ctenodactylus LC
Genus: Stylodipus
 Thick-tailed three-toed jerboa, Stylodipus telum LC
Subfamily: Sicistinae
Genus: Sicista
 Northern birch mouse, Sicista betulina LC
 Altai birch mouse, Sicista napaea LC
 Gray birch mouse, Sicista pseudonapaea DD
 Southern birch mouse, Sicista subtilis LC
 Tien Shan birch mouse, Sicista tianschanica LC
Family: Spalacidae
Subfamily: Myospalacinae
Genus: Myospalax
 Siberian zokor, Myospalax myospalax LC
Subfamily: Spalacinae
Genus: Spalax
 Giant mole-rat, Spalax giganteus VU
Family: Cricetidae
Subfamily: Cricetinae
Genus: Allocricetulus
 Eversmann's hamster, Allocricetulus eversmanni LC
Genus: Cricetulus
 Long-tailed dwarf hamster, Cricetulus longicaudatus LC
 Grey dwarf hamster, Cricetulus migratorius LC
Genus: Cricetus
European hamster, C. cricetus 
Genus: Phodopus
 Roborovski hamster, Phodopus roborovskii LC
 Winter white Russian dwarf hamster, Phodopus sungorus LC
Subfamily: Arvicolinae
Genus: Alticola
 Flat-headed vole, Alticola strelzowi LC
Genus: Clethrionomys
 Bank vole, Clethrionomys glareolus LC
 Northern red-backed vole, Clethrionomys rutilus LC
Genus: Ellobius
 Northern mole vole, Ellobius talpinus LC
 Zaisan mole vole, Ellobius tancrei LC
Genus: Eolagurus
 Yellow steppe lemming, Eolagurus luteus LC
Genus: Lagurus
 Steppe lemming, Lagurus lagurus LC
Genus: Microtus
 Field vole, Microtus agrestis LC
 Tien Shan vole, Microtus kirgisorum LC
 Tundra vole, Microtus oeconomus LC
 Social vole, Microtus socialis LC
Family: Muridae (mice, rats, voles, gerbils, hamsters)
Subfamily: Gerbillinae
Genus: Meriones
 Libyan jird, Meriones libycus LC
 Midday jird, Meriones meridianus LC
 Tamarisk jird, Meriones tamariscinus LC
Genus: Rhombomys
 Great gerbil, Rhombomys opimus LC
Subfamily: Murinae
Genus: Apodemus
 Ural field mouse, Apodemus uralensis LC
Genus: Rattus
Brown rat, R. norvegicus  introduced

Order: Soricomorpha (shrews, moles and solenodons)
The "shrew-forms" are insectivorous mammals. The shrews and solenodons closely resemble mice, while the moles are stout-bodied burrowers.
Family: Soricidae (shrews)
Subfamily: Crocidurinae
Genus: Crocidura
 Lesser rock shrew, Crocidura serezkyensis LC
Lesser white-toothed shrew, C. suaveolens 
Genus: Diplomesodon
 Piebald shrew, Diplomesodon pulchellum LC
Genus: Suncus
 Etruscan shrew, Suncus etruscus LC
Subfamily: Soricinae
Tribe: Nectogalini
Genus: Neomys
 Eurasian water shrew, Neomys fodiens LC
Tribe: Soricini
Genus: Sorex
 Tien Shan shrew, Sorex asper LC
 Laxmann's shrew, Sorex caecutiens LC
 Eurasian pygmy shrew, Sorex minutus LC
Family: Talpidae (moles)
Subfamily: Talpinae
Tribe: Desmanini
Genus: Desmana
 Russian desman, Desmana moschata VU

Locally extinct 
The following species are locally extinct in the country:
 Cheetah, Acinonyx jubatus
 Wild Bactrian camel, Camelus ferus
 Dhole, Cuon alpinus
 European mink, Mustela lutreola
 Tiger, Panthera tigris
 Mongolian gazelle, Procapra gutturosa

References

External links

See also
List of chordate orders
Lists of mammals by region
Mammal classification

.
Mammals
Kazak
Kazakhstan